"I Am the Law" is a single by thrash metal band Anthrax, from the album, Among the Living. It is one of Anthrax's most famous songs, appearing on their best-of albums: Return of the Killer A's, Madhouse: The Very Best of Anthrax and Anthrology: No Hit Wonders (1985–1991).

The song is about the 2000 AD character Judge Dredd and includes references to many of the character's storylines up until 1987.

Single
"I Am the Law" was released in 12-inch single format in 1987, with catalog ID 12IS316 from Island Records. Some versions came with a promo poster. It was also the first single for the album, displaying Judge Dredd's badge with band's logo and a US Flag in the background.

Track Listing
Side A
1. 	I Am the Law 	(04:05)
Side B
2. 	I'm the Man 	(03:04)
3. 	Bud E. Luvbomb and Satan's Lounge Band 	(02:40)

Also issued as a 7" picture disc with only two tracks:
1. I Am the Law (04:13)
2. Bud E. Luvbomb and Satan's Lounge Band (02:47)

There is also a Limited Edition Coloured Vinyl with following track list:
1. I Am the Law (live)
2. Bud E. Luvbomb & Satan's Lounge Band
3. Madhouse (live)
Live tracks recorded at the Odeon, England.

Personnel
Joey Belladonna – lead vocals
Scott Ian – rhythm guitar, backing vocals
Dan Spitz – lead guitar, backing vocals
Frank Bello – bass, backing vocals
Charlie Benante – drums

Charts

References 

1987 singles
Anthrax (American band) songs
1987 songs
Songs written by Scott Ian
Songs written by Dan Spitz
Songs written by Frank Bello
Songs written by Charlie Benante
Island Records singles
Songs written by Joey Belladonna
Songs about fictional male characters